Sardar Swaran Singh (19 August 1907 – 30 October 1994) was an Indian politician. He was India's longest-serving union cabinet minister.

Early life 

Swaran Singh Purewal was born on 19 August 1907 in Shankar (village) in Jalandhar district of Punjab.  He was born in Jat Sikh  family.
He completed his intermediate (High school) at Randhir College in Kapurthala. He then joined Government College, Lahore and completed a degree in Physics with honors.

He then worked as a lecturer in Physics in Lyallpur Khalsa College. After leaving this job he studied law in Government law college in Lahore and received his L.L.B in 1932.

He started a law practice near his birth village in the nearby town of Jallandhar, specialising in criminal law.

Political career

The early days 
In 1930s he joined the Akali Dal political party and by the mid forties he was a prominent leader in the mid-1940s. He played an important role in the compromise between the Indian national congress party and the Akali Dal in the early 1940s.

Just before the 1946 elections, the Panthic Party was formed with Baldev Singh as the leader and Singh was elected its deputy leader. In 1946 he was elected a member of the Punjab legislative assembly.  He then became parliamentary secretary to the Punjab Coalition government.

He was a member of the Punjab Partition Committee where he played an important role.

On 15 August 1947, the day of Indian Independence he was sworn in as Home Minister in the cabinet of the state of Punjab. At the same time the capital of the Punjab was shifted from Shimla to Jalandhar.

On 13 May 1952 he resigned his position here when Jawaharlal Nehru included him in the central cabinet.

In the central government 
He entered the cabinet of India's first prime minister, Jawaharlal Nehru, in 1952, and was that government's last surviving member.

He spent 23 years of his life as a high ranking Cabinet Minister in the Government of India. He had a reputation for being an effective debater and negotiator. "His debates at the UN Security Council on Bangladesh's cause, when East Pakistan liberation war (1971) was in full swing, were impressive," attests Former Indian ambassador to the United Nations, Narendra P Jain, "He proved to be more than just a match for his then Pakistani counterpart Zulfikar Ali Bhutto. During one of the council debates when Bhutto said that Sardar's hands are full of blood in conflict, Swarn Singh got up and showed his clean, spotless hands." He was familiar with and was a proficient speaker of several languages. He assisted Jawaharlal Nehru in his talks with the Chinese leader Chou-En-Lai, on the Indo-China border question in 1960. He was in the Indian delegation during the six rounds of talks with Pakistan in 1962–63.

He remained a part of successive governments until he resigned in November 1975.

He was elected to the Lok Sabha in 1957, 1962, 1967 and 1972.

Cabinet positions 
To this date he is the longest-serving union cabinet minister in India. Babu Jajgivan Ram holds the record for maximum duration as cabinet minister i.e. around 30 years, but the record for consistent and uninterrupted membership of the cabinet in continuation is held by Mr. Swaran Singh.

He is best known for his role as India's external affairs minister.

He was also president of the National Congress in 1969, and 1978.

External Affairs Minister 
He visited the USSR in July 1966 along with then Prime Minister Indira Gandhi.

On 9 August 1971, he signed "The Treaty of Peace, Friendship and Cooperation between the USSR and the Republic of India" which provided for closer contacts between the two countries in economic, political cultural and other fields. The treaty was also a defense pact under with both countries were obliged to come to each other's assistance in the event go a conflict with a third country. This treaty was binding for 20 years and was co signed by Andrei Gromyko

He led the Indian delegation to the UN general assembly in 1971 to explain India's position in the ongoing war with Pakistan.

George H. W. Bush, who at the time was the US Ambassador to the UN and led the US delegation at the UN security council demanded an unconditional cease fire by India to which Swaran Singh responded, "this one sided and partisan attitude of the distinguished representative of the United States has shocked and surprised us. The US is entitled to its own opinions and interpretations, so are we. But facts are facts and must be stated. Right from the beginning of this unfortunate situation that has arisen in the subcontinent, India had been asking for a political settlement acceptable to elected and acknowledged representatives of the people of Bangladesh."

On 16 December 1971, East Pakistan troops there surrendered to joint forces of Bangladesh and India, who had seized the capital city of Dacca (now Dhaka).

Swaran Singh Committee 

Sardar Swaran Singh was chairperson of the committee entrusted with the responsibility of studying the Constitution of India in 1976 during the national emergency. Soon after the declaration of the national emergency, Indira Gandhi constituted a committee under the Chairmanship of Sardar Swaran Singh to study the question of amending the constitution in the light of past experiences. Based on its recommendations, the government incorporated several changes to the Constitution including the Preamble, through the Forty-second Amendment of the Constitution of India (passed in 1976 and came into effect on 3 January 1977)

Awards 
He was awarded Padma Vibhushan award - the second highest civil award by the republic of India  in 1992.

The Eminent Persons Group on South Africa 

Sardar Swaran Singh met with Nelson Mandela in prison three times in the mid 1980s. He was a member of the eminent persons group on South Africa sponsored by the Commonwealth Institute that consisted of Malcolm Fraser who had been Prime Minister of Australia for eight years, General Obasanjo of Nigeria, Lord Barber who had been Edward Heath's Chancellor of the Exchequer and was also chairman of the Standard Chartered Bank, Dame Nita Barrow, Reverend Scott and John Malecela, a Tanzanian former government minister. The group went to South Africa and spent five weeks there to collect information, interact with local people, and met with Nelson Mandela and the ANC; their findings were published by the Commonwealth Institute entitled "Mission to South Africa: the Commonwealth Report".

UNESCO Boards of Directors 
Sardar Swaran Singh served as a member of board of directors from 1985 - 1989 for sessions 123 - 132.

References

External links
Obituary
On Swaran Singh at Sikh-History.com
 Detailed Article on his life history

Indian National Congress politicians
1907 births
1994 deaths
Indian Sikhs
Recipients of the Padma Vibhushan in public affairs
Railway Ministers of India
India MPs 1957–1962
India MPs 1962–1967
India MPs 1967–1970
India MPs 1971–1977
Ministers for External Affairs of India
Agriculture Ministers of India
Guru Nanak Dev University alumni
Lok Sabha members from Punjab, India
Shiromani Akali Dal politicians
Panthic Party politicians
Rajya Sabha members from Punjab, India
Defence Ministers of India
People from Jalandhar district
Indian National Congress (U) politicians